Nuno Miguel Fidalgo dos Santos (born 19 March 1982), known as Fidalgo, is a Portuguese professional footballer who plays as a forward.

Club career
Fidalgo was born in Caniçal. A youth product of C.D. Nacional he moved into the first team in 2000, but only managed a combined 18 appearances in his first two seasons. Afterwards, he served three consecutive loan stints, two of those with Madeiran neighbours A.D. Camacha and C.F. União in the third division; in between, he spent the 2006–07 campaign with Cyprus' AEK Larnaca FC.

In 2009–10 another loan ensued, now to Académica de Coimbra, alongside teammate Bruno Amaro. For the following season the move was made permanent, and he scored on his league debut on 15 August 2010, helping shock-defeat title holders S.L. Benfica 2–1 away from home; he finished the campaign as the Students' top scorer, in a narrow escape from relegation from the Primeira Liga.

References

External links

1982 births
Living people
People from Machico, Madeira
Portuguese footballers
Madeiran footballers
Association football forwards
Primeira Liga players
Liga Portugal 2 players
Segunda Divisão players
C.D. Nacional players
C.F. União players
Associação Académica de Coimbra – O.A.F. players
Vitória F.C. players
Cypriot First Division players
AEK Larnaca FC players
Portuguese expatriate footballers
Expatriate footballers in Cyprus
Portuguese expatriate sportspeople in Cyprus